Andy Panayi is a British jazz musician, skilled in performance, composition and arranging. He plays all the flutes and all the saxophones and leads a selection of jazz and classical groups. He also writes commissioned works and self commissioned work for his own arranging, composing & transcribing business ALP Music.

British Jazz Scene 
Born in Islington in north London and interested in music from an early age, Andy studied at the Trinity College of Music before embarking on a professional music career.

Andy is a leading member of the British jazz scene having performed and recorded with a selection of artists including Shirley Bassey, Paul McCartney, Salena Jones and Helen Shapiro.

He's also worked alongside or supported many other leading musicians and groups including The Moscow City Ballet, Ronnie Scott & his Side-men, BBC Big Band, John Dankworth and Cleo Laine, Humphrey Lyttelton, Suzi Quatro, and others.

He now works with the Associated Board of the Royal Schools of Music (ABRSM) as a consultant specialising in developing the Jazz syllabus for future examinations.

Awards 

Panayi has won several awards during his career including; The Marty Paich Arranging Award, The John Dankworth Soloist Award, The Worshipful Company of Musicians Jazz Medal, British Jazz Awards for Jazz Flute.

Discography 

 Annie Get Your Gun - 1986 London Cast - plays woodwinds in the album from the first London revival of Irving Berlin's musical Annie Get Your Gun, starring Suzi Quatro as Annie Oakley and Eric Flynn as Frank Butler
 "News from Blueport" - The Andy Panayi Quartet plays a tribute to Gerry Mulligan
 "Uschi's House" - Flux (Latin Jazz/House music CD) playing flutes & saxes
 "Blown Away" -The Andy Panayi Quartet - on Ronnie Scott's Jazz House A top 10 album of the year in the Jazz Journal of 2001
 "Whooeeee" - The Andy Panayi Quartet - on Mainstem Records featured as CD OF THE WEEK in The Observer.
 "Time Displaced" - The Andy Panayi Jazz Flute - on Mainstem Records featured as CD OF THE WEEK in The Observer.

References

External links 
 Andy Panayi's internet pages

Living people
British jazz flautists
Year of birth missing (living people)